The 2005 French Open was the 109th edition of the tournament.

On the men's side, Rafael Nadal, seeded fourth at his first French Open, was a strong favorite to win the singles title after winning the Monte Carlo and Rome Masters. Guillermo Coria, the defending finalist and 2005 runner-up to Nadal in both Monaco and Rome, called Nadal the best clay-court player in the world prior to the tournament. After defeating top seed Roger Federer in the semifinals, Nadal defeated Mariano Puerta to claim his first French Open title, and the first of four won consecutively from 2005 until 2008. Nadal would go on to win the tournament a record 14 times.

In the women's draw, Justine Henin-Hardenne won her second French Open title, defeating 2000 champion Mary Pierce in the final in just 62 minutes. 2005 marked the first of three consecutive years in which Henin would win the women's singles title.

Gastón Gaudio and Anastasia Myskina were unsuccessful in defending their 2004 titles, Gaudio losing in the fourth round and Myskina being upset in the first round. This tournament was also notable for the rise of future French Open champion Ana Ivanovic, who upset the third seed Amélie Mauresmo in the third round, before going on to defeat another future champion in Francesca Schiavone on her way to her first major quarterfinal appearance in just her second major tournament.

Points distribution
Below are the tables with the point distribution for each discipline of the tournament.

Senior points

Seniors

Men's singles

 Rafael Nadal defeated  Mariano Puerta, 6–7(6–8), 6–3, 6–1, 7–5
It was Nadal's 6th title of the year, and his 7th overall. It was his 1st career Grand Slam title.

Women's singles

 Justine Henin-Hardenne defeated  Mary Pierce, 6–1, 6–1
It was Henin-Hardenne's 4th title of the year, and her 23rd overall. It was her 4th career Grand Slam title, and her 2nd French Open title.

Men's doubles

 Jonas Björkman /  Max Mirnyi defeated  Mike Bryan /  Bob Bryan, 2–6, 6–1, 6–4

Women's doubles

 Virginia Ruano Pascual /  Paola Suárez defeated  Cara Black /  Liezel Huber, 4–6, 6–3, 6–3

Mixed doubles

 Daniela Hantuchová /  Fabrice Santoro defeated  Martina Navratilova /  Leander Paes, 3–6, 6–3, 6–2

Juniors

Boys' singles

 Marin Čilić defeated  Antal van der Duim, 6–3, 6–1

Girls' singles

 Ágnes Szávay defeated  Raluca-Ioana Olaru, 6–2, 6–1

Boys' doubles

 Emiliano Massa /  Leonardo Mayer defeated  Sergei Bubka /  Jérémy Chardy, 2–6, 6–3, 6–4

Girls' doubles

 Victoria Azarenka /  Ágnes Szávay defeated  Raluca-Ioana Olaru /  Amina Rakhim, 4–6, 6–4, 6–0

Singles seeds
The following are the seeded players and notable players who withdrew from the event. Seedings are based on ATP and WTA rankings as of 16 May 2005. Rankings and points are as of before 23 May 2005.

Men's singles 

† The player did not qualify the tournament in 2004. Accordingly, this was the points from the 18th best result are deducted instead.

The following players would have been seeded, but they withdrew from the event.

Women's singles

Wildcard entries
Below are the lists of the wildcard awardees entering in the main draws.

Men's singles wildcard entries
  Thierry Ascione
  Arnaud Clément
  Peter Luczak
  Gaël Monfils
  Olivier Patience
  Florent Serra
  Gilles Simon
  Jo-Wilfried Tsonga

Women's singles wildcard entries
  Mailyne Andrieux
  Alizé Cornet
  Youlia Fedossova
  Sophie Ferguson
  Mathilde Johansson
  Pauline Parmentier
  Camille Pin
  Aravane Rezaï

Men's doubles wildcard entries
  Thierry Ascione /  Jean-René Lisnard
  Grégory Carraz /  Antony Dupuis
  Jérémy Chardy /  Nicolas Renavand
  Nicolas Devilder /  Marc Gicquel
  Jérôme Haehnel /  Florent Serra
  Olivier Mutis /  Olivier Patience
  Édouard Roger-Vasselin /  Gilles Simon

Women's doubles wildcard entries
  Mailyne Andrieux /  Pauline Parmentier
  Séverine Beltrame /  Camille Pin
  Kildine Chevalier /  Stéphanie Foretz
  Youlia Fedossova /  Violette Huck
  Florence Haring /  Virginie Pichet
  Mathilde Johansson /  Aurélie Védy
  Martina Navratilova /  Arantxa Sánchez Vicario

Mixed doubles wildcard entries
  Séverine Beltrame /  Michaël Llodra
  Alizé Cornet /  Gaël Monfils
  Stéphanie Foretz /  Nicolas Devilder
  Émilie Loit /  Jean-François Bachelot
  Camille Pin /  Arnaud Clément
  Sandrine Testud /  Marc Gicquel

Qualifier entries

Men's qualifiers entries

  Saša Tuksar
  Stan Wawrinka
  Tomas Behrend
  Jarkko Nieminen
  Lukáš Dlouhý
  Daniel Gimeno Traver
  Fernando Vicente
  Antony Dupuis
  Robin Vik
  Marcos Daniel
  Dudi Sela
  Tomas Tenconi
  James Blake
  Chris Guccione
  Novak Djokovic
  Kristof Vliegen

The following players received entry into a lucky loser spot:
  Daniele Bracciali
  Dick Norman
  Flávio Saretta
  Juan Pablo Brzezicki
  Hugo Armando

Women's qualifiers entries

  Meilen Tu
  Sofia Arvidsson
  Clarisa Fernández
  Sandra Klösel
  Petra Mandula
  Michaëlla Krajicek
  Eva Birnerová
  Yvonne Meusburger
  Mervana Jugić-Salkić
  Libuše Průšová
  Anastasiya Yakimova
  Mara Santangelo

The following player received entry into a lucky loser spot:
  Lucie Šafářová

Withdrawals

Men's singles
 Agustín Calleri → replaced by  David Sánchez
 Taylor Dent → replaced by  Daniele Bracciali
 Lleyton Hewitt → replaced by  Dick Norman
 Joachim Johansson → replaced by  Flávio Saretta
 Edgardo Massa → replaced by  Scott Draper
 Sjeng Schalken → replaced by  Hugo Armando
 Potito Starace → replaced by  Juan Pablo Brzezicki
 Martin Verkerk → replaced by  Thomas Enqvist
 Mariano Zabaleta → replaced by  Julien Benneteau

Women's singles
 Li Na → replaced by  Evie Dominikovic
 Alicia Molik → replaced by  Silvija Talaja
 Serena Williams → replaced by  Lucie Šafářová

Official videogame
An official videogame for the tournament, Roland Garros 2005: Powered by Smash Court Tennis, was launched exclusively for the PlayStation 2 platform. The game, which is an updated version of Smash Court Tennis Pro Tournament 2, featured 15 licensed players and 4 official courts of the tournament: Court Philippe Chatrier, Court Suzanne Lenglen, Court 1 and Court 2.

Notes

External links
 French Open official website
 Men's draw
 Women's draw

 
2005 in French tennis
2005 in Paris
May 2005 sports events in France
June 2005 sports events in France